José Rivera (born 11 January 1963) is an Ecuadorian footballer. He played in three matches for the Ecuador national football team in 1991. He was also part of Ecuador's squad for the 1991 Copa América tournament.

References

External links
 

1963 births
Living people
Ecuadorian footballers
Ecuador international footballers
Place of birth missing (living people)
People from Esmeraldas Province
Association football defenders